Rodrigo Blanco Calderón (born 1981) is a Venezuelan writer from Caracas.  He completed his doctorate in literature and linguistics from Paris XIII University with a dissertation on the work his literary mentor, Venezuela writer Juan Carlos Méndez Guédez. He has published several collections of stories, among them Una larga fila de hombres, Los Invencibles, Las rayas and Los terneros. He has also published a novel titled The Night. A translation of his short story 'Payaso' (Clown) appears in the anthology Crude Words: Contemporary Writing from Venezuela (Ragpicker Press, 2016).

In 2007, he was named as one of the Bogota39, a list of the best young writers in Latin America. In 2013, he participated in the International Writing Program at the University of Iowa. He currently lives in Málaga.

Awards
 2019 – Premio Bienal de Novela Mario Vargas Llosa for The Night
 2018 – Premio de la Crítica 2016-2017 for The Night
 2017 – Finalista del V Premio Narrativa Breve Ribera del Duero for Los terneros
 2016 – Premio Rive Gauche à Paris du Livre Étranger for The Night
 2007 – LXI Concurso Anual de Cuentos del diario El Nacional for the story "Los golpes de la vida"
 2005 – Premio en el concurso de autores inéditos de la editorial Monte Ávila for Una fila de hombres. Monte Ávila is a public publishing house dependent of the National Ministry of Culture of the Bolivarian Republic of Venezuela.

References

1981 births
Living people
Venezuelan male short story writers
Venezuelan short story writers
21st-century Venezuelan novelists
Male novelists
21st-century male writers
Writers from Caracas
University of Paris alumni
Venezuelan expatriates in France